There are eleven disused railway stations between Exeter St Davids and Plymouth Millbay, Devon, England. At eight of these there are visible remains. Of the eleven stations, South Brent and Plympton are subject of campaigns for reopening while Ivybridge station was replaced by another station on a different site.

Background
The South Devon Railway was opened in stages between 30 May 1846 and 2 April 1849. It was originally designed to operate on the atmospheric principle but this was not successful and was never completed beyond Newton Abbot. It was amalgamated into the Great Western Railway on 1 February 1876 and now forms part of the Exeter to Plymouth Line.

Stations

Exminster
Located at 

A station was built at Exminster by George Hennet. It was opened in August 1852 and operated by him on behalf of the South Devon Railway until January 1857 when the railway company took over. An Italianate building on the west side of the single track housed a booking office and waiting room on the ground floor, with accommodation above for the station master. Hennet also operated a goods siding and coal shed at the station.

It was situated where a bridge carried a road down to a ferry across the River Exe to Topsham. It had been proposed that a branch line should be built from Exminster across the river to Exmouth, but in the event the London and South Western Railway built one instead from Exeter.

The line through Exminster was doubled in November 1859 and so a second platform for southbound (down) trains was built; passengers used the road bridge to cross to it. The siding was extended to provide a refuge for up trains in 1894, and a down refuge siding was constructed north of the bridge in 1906; these allowed slow goods trains to be overtaken.

In 1924 the facilities were greatly enlarged. A new passenger loop was laid behind the southbound platform, so now down stopping passenger trains could be overtaken while in the station. This meant that the road bridge had to be extended across the loop line with a second span. A new signal box was provided at this time. In 1931 an up platform loop was squeezed into the space between the station building and the platform and the bridge extended again. A new booking office was provided on the approach to the bridge.

In 1940 the down refuge siding was converted into a loop so that goods trains could run straight in without reversing, and three loop sidings were provided behind the platform. These were originally intended to help the flow of goods traffic during the Second World War, but later became a useful place to stable empty passenger trains on busy summer Saturdays.

The station closed for passenger traffic on 30 March 1964 and for goods on 4 December 1967, although only coal traffic had been handled for the previous 27 months. The refuge sidings had already been removed by then, and the loop sidings behind the down platform converted to dead-ends. They continued to see occasional use until 1985. The signal box was closed on 14 November 1986 but remained in situ until September 2006 but has now been removed for preservation to Broadway, Worcestershire. The 1852 station building still survives.

In an update in April 2020, officers of Devon County Council said that a decision had been made to prioritise Marsh Barton over a possible reopening of this station. Lack of track capacity meant that it was 'almost impossible' to open both.

Brent

Located at 

Brent railway station served the village of South Brent on the southern edge of Dartmoor. It was not ready when the railway was opened, but was brought into use six weeks later on 15 June 1848.

On 19 December 1893 the station became a junction, with the opening of the Kingsbridge Branch Line. The branch line closed on 16 September 1963 and there was little reason for the station after that. Goods traffic was withdrawn on 6 April 1964 and to passengers on 5 October 1964.

The former goods shed on the westbound (Plymouth) side is still intact. The signalbox was finally demolished in November 2014

Wrangaton
Located at 

The station was opened with the line on 5 May 1848; at the time, the only intermediate station  between Totnes and the temporary terminus at Laira. From 1849 to 1893 the station was known as Kingsbridge Road, becoming "Wrangaton" once more when the branch line to Kingsbridge opened.

The station was closed to passengers on 2 March 1959 but goods traffic continued to be handled until 9 September 1963.  Part of the platform is still visible just west of Wrangaton Tunnel, as are the former Admiralty sidings on the north side of the line.

The signalbox from Wrangaton is now preserved as an exhibit at Kidderminster Railway Museum, adjacent to the Severn Valley Railway in Worcestershire.

Bittaford Platform
Located at 

An unstaffed station was opened by the Great Western Railway at Bittaford on 18 November 1907 and closed on 2 March 1959. It was situated immediately east of Bittaford Viaduct.

There were no goods facilities but Redlake Siding was opened  mile to the west on 10 September 1911. This siding served a large china clay drier which processed clay brought by pipeline from Redlake on Dartmoor; the eight mile long,  gauge Redlake Tramway was used to carry materials between Redlake Siding and the clay pits.

There are no visible remains of the platform, but original iron tube fencing remains to be seen behind the site of the former London bound platform. The clay drier at Redlake Siding is still intact, now modified for use by an engineering company, despite the siding closing on 7 July 1932.

Ivybridge
Located at 

The station at Ivybridge was not complete when the railway was opened, but was brought into use six weeks later on 15 June 1848. The building was situated on the north side of the track, immediately to the west of Ivybridge Viaduct.

The line originally had just a single track but was doubled to the west on 11 June 1893 and from the far side of the viaduct to the east on 13 August 1893.  A new stone viaduct to replace Isambard Kingdom Brunel's timber structure was brought into use in 1894 and allow the joining up of the double-track sections.  This was on a new alignment which forced the construction of a new westbound (down) platform further back from the old line. The up platform was widened and this left the building set back at an odd angle to the track.

The goods shed at the station was replaced on 1 October 1911 by a new facility further west, which still survives in commercial use.  In 1968 this was altered for shipping china clay brought from workings on Dartmoor by lorry. A signal box was situated on the south side of the line between the station and the goods yard from 1895 until 1973. The goods station closed on 2 November 1965 although passenger traffic had ceased from 2 March 1959. A replacement Ivybridge railway station was opened a mile away on the far side of the viaduct on 15 July 1994. The goods shed is still standing.

Cornwood

Located at 

A station was built at Cornwood by George Hennet. It was opened in 1852 and operated by him on behalf of the South Devon Railway until January 1857 when the railway company took over. Until 1864 it was known as "Cornwood Road".

An Italianate building on the north side of the single track housed a booking office and waiting room on the ground floor, with accommodation above for the station master. It was situated in a cutting in the  mile between Blatchford and Slade viaducts. The line was doubled from Hemerdon to Cornwood on 16 May 1893 and a signal box was opened at the east end of the station. The double line was extended to Blatchford viaduct on 19 November 1893. This doubling required the construction of a new platform for westbound (down) trains. The station closed for passenger trains on 2 March 1959. A loop line was provided to the east of the platform for up trains which was closed on 26 February 1962; the signal box was kept in use until 26 February 1963.

The London bound platform and station building can still be seen from passing trains.

Plympton

Located at 

Railway facilities in Plympton had originally been provided by the horse-drawn Plymouth and Dartmoor Railway, but their branch to Plympton was closed and sold to the South Devon Railway to allow the construction of their new line. The new station was not ready to be opened with the railway, but was brought into use six weeks later on 15 June 1848.

From 1 June 1904 it was the eastern terminus for enhanced Plymouth area suburban services, which saw steam railmotors used to fight competition from electric trams.

The station closed to passengers on 2 March 1959 but goods traffic continued to be handled until 1 June 1964.

A Plymouth Joint plan that was opened for consultation in 2018 included a suggested 'Plymouth Metro' with a station at Plympton. However, as of May 2020, nothing had been enacted.

Laira
A temporary terminus was opened at Laira on the outskirts of Plymouth on 5 May 1848 while work continued on Mutley Tunnel and the final stretch of the line to Millbay. Two wooden train sheds were provided and a horse-drawn bus conveyed passengers to and from the town. It was closed when the line to Millbay was opened on 3 April 1849.

A new facility, known as "Laira Halt" (located at ) was opened by the Great Western Railway on 1 June 1904 close to the Laira engine shed. This, along with several other small stations, formed a scheme to introduce a suburban train service in competition with electric trams. Laira Halt was not particularly successful and was closed from 7 July 1930, although the steps leading to the platform can still be seen beside the tracks.

Lipson Vale Halt
Located at 

Another of the small stations opened by the Great Western Railway on 1 June 1904 was Lipson Vale Halt. It was situated on the east side of Mutley Tunnel between Laira Halt and the older station at Mutley.

The GWR suburban service was withdrawn on 7 July 1930, although local Southern Railway trains continued to call until 4 May 1942 when the station was closed and dismantled as its wooden platforms were thought to be a fire risk during The Blitz.

Mutley

Located at 

The second permanent station in Plymouth was opened on 1 August 1871 to the west of the tunnel beneath Mutley Plain. It was financed by local people in return for a promise of railway shares once it was attracting a profitable level of business. It became a joint station used also by the London and South Western Railway trains when they arrived in the area by running over the railway from Tavistock, which they did from 18 May 1876.

A new joint North Road railway station was built in 1877, just a few yards to the west of Mutley and this became the main station for the city. The London and South Western trains entered Plymouth on a new line from the west after 2 June 1890 and for a while terminated at North Road, but they returned to Mutley on 1 July 1891 when their new terminus at Plymouth Friary was opened, but now they ran in the opposite direction to before. Trains from Friary to Exeter St Davids stopped on the southern platform, those from Millbay to Exeter St Davids stopping on the north.

Mutley was closed from 2 March 1939 to allow for track alterations in association with the rebuilding of North Road station.

Plymouth Millbay

Located at 

The trains of the South Devon Railway finally reached the town of Plymouth on 2 April 1849. Docks were opened adjacent to the station and a new headquarters office was built next door. The station was expanded ready for the opening of the Cornwall Railway on 4 May 1859 and the South Devon and Tavistock Railway on 22 June 1859. It became known as "Plymouth Millbay" after other stations were opened in the town in 1876–7 at Mutley and North Road.

The station was closed to passengers on 23 April 1941 after bombs destroyed the nearby goods depot; the passenger station being used thereafter only for goods traffic and access to the carriage sheds. All traffic ceased from 14 December 1969 except for goods trains running through to the docks which continued until 30 June 1971.

The  site is now occupied by the Plymouth Pavilions leisure complex. Two granite gate posts outside the Millbay Road entrance are all that is left of the station, although a goods shed on what used to be Washington Place is still extant nearby

See also
Disused railway stations (Bristol to Exeter Line)
Disused railway stations (Riviera Line)
Disused railway stations (Cornish Main Line)
South Devon Railway engine houses

References

 
 
 
 
 

 
 
 

 Exeter to Plymouth
 Exeter to Plymouth